Professor Clifford Walter Emmens DSc, Hon DVSc, FAA (19 December 1913, Peckham, London – 22 June 1999) was an English-born Australian veterinary scientist and biometrician. He was appointed Professor of Veterinary Physiology at the University of Sydney in 1950, and elected Fellow of the Australian Academy of Science in 1956.

References

Fellows of the Australian Academy of Science
1913 births
1999 deaths
British emigrants to Australia
Australian veterinarians
Male veterinarians